Robert Addison Dague (27 March 1841 – 16 February 1918) was an American politician in Iowa.

Dague was born near Stanton, a town in Morrow County, Ohio, on 27 March 1841. In 1863, he was made a sergeant in Company G of the 88th Ohio Infantry Regiment and discharged shortly thereafter for health reasons. Dague subsequently moved to Osceola, Iowa. He was affiliated with the Republican Party and served a single four-year term for District 6 of the Iowa Senate between 1872 and 1876. Outside of politics, Dague was a newspaper journalist and editor of the Osceola Sentinel. He died in Creston on 16 February 1918.

References

People from Osceola, Iowa
1918 deaths
People from Morrow County, Ohio
Republican Party Iowa state senators
1841 births
19th-century American newspaper editors
Editors of Iowa newspapers
19th-century American politicians
People of Ohio in the American Civil War